The 1953 All-Ireland Senior Hurling Championship Final was the 66th All-Ireland Final and the culmination of the 1953 All-Ireland Senior Hurling Championship, an inter-county hurling tournament for the top teams in Ireland. The match was held at Croke Park, Dublin, on 6 September 1953, between Cork and Galway. The Connacht men narrowly lost to their Munster opponents on a score line of 3-3 to 0-8.

Match details

Due to the clash of colours, both counties lined out in their provincial jerseys, Cork wearing Munster's blue while Galway wore the white of Connacht.

Cork Team:

D. Creedon, J. Riordan, J. Lyons, A. O'Shaughnessy, M. Fouhy, D. Hayes,  V. Twomey, J. Twomey, G. Murphy, W. J. Daly, J. Hartnett, C. Ring, T. O'Sullivan, L. Dowling, P. Barry  

All-Ireland Senior Hurling Championship Final
All-Ireland Senior Hurling Championship Final, 1953
All-Ireland Senior Hurling Championship Final
All-Ireland Senior Hurling Championship Finals
Cork county hurling team matches
Galway GAA matches